Row DTLA (stylized as ROW DTLA, formerly known as Alameda Square) is a commercial district located in Downtown Los Angeles, which is situated at the intersection of Fashion District, Skid Row, and the Arts District. It spans over 30 acres and was repurposed from the historic Alameda Square complex. The mixed-use development comprises 100 retail stores, restaurants, and 1.3 million square feet (120,000 m²) of commercial workspace.

The 7th Street Produce Market, which is an open-air wholesale produce market that was established in 1917, occupies a 5-acre (2.0 ha) area within ROW DTLA.  The marketplace is converted into Smorgasburg, a food market, every Sunday.

History 
Los Angeles Terminal Mart, a national hub for produce growers, was designed by LA architect John Parkinson, a prominent LA architect and constructed between 1917 and 1923. It was strategically located at the terminus of the Southern Pacific Railroad, connecting the city's port with its downtown by rail. 

The sprawling campus eventually became known as Alameda Square and was one of the most ambitious private developments of early-20th century Los Angeles.

At one point, the majority of American produce was sold at the complex, becoming the second largest wholesale terminal in the world. Between the 1920s and the 1980s, the complex housed two of Los Angeles' largest wholesale produce markets, Seventh Street and Ninth Street markets. In 1986, market operations were consolidated under the Los Angeles Wholesale Produce Market. 

Until the late 2010s, the site served as the headquarters and manufacturing base of American Apparel. LA architect John Parkinson. Los Angeles Terminal Mart was a national hub for produce growers, situated at the terminus of the Southern Pacific Railroad. The sprawling campus eventually became known as Alameda Square, which was one of the most ambitious private developments of early–20th century Los Angeles, connecting the city's port with its downtown by rail.

At one point, the majority of American produce was sold at the complex, becoming the second largest wholesale terminal in the world. Between the 1920s and the 1980s, the complex housed two of Los Angeles' largest wholesale produce markets, Seventh Street and Ninth Street markets. In 1986, market operations were consolidated under the Los Angeles Wholesale Produce Market. 

Until the late 2010s, the site served as the headquarters and manufacturing base of American Apparel.

See also 

 Downtown Los Angeles, California

References

External links 

 

Shopping malls in Los Angeles
Los Angeles
2017 establishments in California
Shopping districts and streets in Greater Los Angeles
John and Donald Parkinson buildings
History of Los Angeles
Buildings and structures completed in 1923
Southern Pacific Railroad stations
Food markets in the United States